Box Lake is a glacial tarn in the Ruby Mountains, in Elko County in the northeastern part of the state of Nevada. Along with Snow Lake, it is one of the sources of the stream which flows down Box Canyon. After exiting the mountains it merges with other streams to form the South Fork of the Humboldt River.

Lakes of Elko County, Nevada
Ruby Mountains
Lakes of Nevada